is a 1996 artbook, written and illustrated by Hayao Miyazaki, containing the original watercolor illustrations that were concept sketches used by the Nausicaä of the Valley of the Wind manga and its film adaptation. Tokuma Shoten first released the artbook on July 31, 1996. The artbook was licensed for a North American release by Viz Media, which released the book on November 6, 2007. It was also licensed in Australasia by Madman Entertainment and in France by Glénat as Nausicaä - Recueil D'aquarelles (French: Nausicaä: Collection of Watercolors).

Reception
Comic Book Bin's Leeroy Douresseaux commends "Miyazaki's imagination as bountiful, prodigious, and maybe even protean." He further commends the commentary that accompanies the pictures for providing "humor and insight".  About.com's Deb Aoki commends the book as "gorgeous, full-color illustrations by the modern master of animation". PopCultureShock's Katherine Dacey comments on the book with "while readers may not learn much from Miyazaki’s commentary (he spends a great deal of time disavowing his work), they will develop a greater appreciation for his creative process by studying the rough paintings and quick sketches at the back of the volume, which show many of the characters and creatures of Nausicaa in embryonic form."

References

1996 books
Books about visual art
Nausicaä of the Valley of the Wind
Viz Media